"Peace Frog" is a song by the Doors, which was released on their fifth studio album Morrison Hotel in 1970.  Guitarist Robby Krieger explained that the music was written and recorded first, with the lyrics later coming from poems by singer Jim Morrison. Although the song was never released as a single in the US, it was issued as the B-side of "You Make Me Real" in France.

"Peace Frog" was included on the Doors' second compilation album Weird Scenes Inside the Gold Mine, released in 1972.

Lyrics
The song's lyrics were derived from three poems written earlier by Morrison, titled "Abortion Stories", "Dawn's Highway" and "Newborn Awakening". However, due to the songwriters' initial failure to match lyrics, the other group members recorded an instrumental version of "Peace Frog", in which Morrison later overdubbed his vocals after managing to find out the appropriate lyrics to the music.  The Doors performed the instrumental version at live shows during 1969. The title was originally "Abortion Stories", but at producer Paul A. Rothchild's request Morrison changed it to "Peace Frog", as he was afraid that the initial title would create some controversy.

"Peace Frog" features lines inspired by true events surrounding the band's frontman Morrison.  The line "Blood in the streets in the town of New Haven" is a reference to his onstage arrest on December 9, 1967, during a live performance in New Haven Arena. After the guitar solo, the song enters a spoken word verse with the lines "Indians scattered on dawn's highway bleeding", which describes a highway accident that occurred when he was young. Morrison reportedly witnessed dead Native Americans while his family was crossing a desert by road in Albuquerque, New Mexico. He said, "That was the first time I tasted fear. I musta' been about four." Morrison was also referring to the 1968 Democratic National Convention protests with the lyric "Blood in the street/ The town of Chicago".

Critical reception
Unlike the Doors previous album, The Soft Parade, Morrison Hotel received positive responses by critics, and it was widely seen as a comeback in the band's quality. "Peace Frog" is also praised as one of the album's highlights. Louder Sound ranked the song among "The Top 20 Greatest Doors Songs", while Ultimate Classic Rock cited it as Robby Krieger's third best track for the group. Krieger himself, included it as one of his personal favorite Doors songs on The Doors: Box Set.

In a positive album review of Morrison Hotel, critic Thom Jerek of AllMusic described "Peace Frog" as "downright funky boogie". Sal Cinquemani writing for Slant Magazine, declared the song as the best track on Morrison Hotel, and "one of the Doors' greatest." Critic Jason Elias wrote that the song is "one of those tracks that will constantly amaze." He praised Robby Krieger's "bluesy lines" and Ray Manzarek's "eerie keyboards add to the chaos as usual."  Tony Thompson said that it is one of the Doors' greatest songs despite the "slightly absurd" title, and that it received radio airplay despite not being released as a single.  Hartford Courant critic J. Greg Robertson regarded the music and lyric to be "magnificent."

Personnel
The Doors
 Jim Morrisonvocals
 Ray ManzarekVox Continental organ
 Robby Kriegerelectric guitar with wah-wah pedal
 John Densmoredrums

Session musicians
 Ray Neapolitanbass guitar

References

The Doors songs
1969 songs
Songs written by John Densmore
Songs written by Robby Krieger
Songs written by Ray Manzarek
Songs written by Jim Morrison
Song recordings produced by Paul A. Rothchild
Songs about Native Americans